A suspended game in baseball occurs when a game has to be stopped before it can be completed, and the game is meant to be finished at a later time or date. Suspended games are used in Major League Baseball, Minor League Baseball, and may also be used at other levels of play (such as college baseball or the Little League World Series) depending on league or tournament rules.

Rules
Within the Official Baseball Rules of Major League Baseball (MLB), Rule 7.02—"Suspended, Postponed, and Tie Games"—details the circumstances under which a game may be suspended. In general, a game becomes suspended when it is halted by:
A curfew imposed by law
A predetermined time limit
Artificial light failure or other mechanical problems that impact the game
Darkness, if the lights cannot be turned on as a result of local law
Inclement weather during an official game (that is, enough innings have been played to yield a result) and an inning is in progress, and during that inning the visiting team is currently leading (as the home team might still tie the game or retake the lead)
A regulation game called with the score tied—no ties are possible under the modern rules, except in the rare event that a game gets called between two teams who are meeting for the last time in the season, and the outcome of the game has no impact on the postseason.

The rule goes on to describe when the game can or must be resumed. Typically, it is to be resumed right before the next scheduled game between the two clubs at the same location. Alternative scenarios are also outlined.

Broader use of suspended games
Following the 2008 World Series, MLB adopted a change that now requires all postseason games to be played to completion (at least nine innings); situations where inclement weather might otherwise end a game early now result in a postseason game being suspended and resumed. This policy appears as a "Comment" with Rule 7.02(a) in the Official Baseball Rules, and also applies to any potential tie-breaker games at the end of the regular season.

For the shortened  season, MLB broadened the use of suspended games for the regular season as well, essentially avoiding situations where a game would need to be restarted from the beginning; this broadened use of suspended games during the regular season was carried over to the  season.

History
The use of suspended games in MLB has changed over time. Originally, all games were played to completion, unless they were halted by external conditions such as darkness or weather. Halted games that had not yet progressed to the point of being an official game were replayed (from the beginning) at a later date, regardless of the score. Halted games that had become official games either had a winner declared, or in the case of ties were replayed (also from the beginning) at a later date. Since World War II, suspended games have been used, for varying reasons depending on league rules of an era, to avoid having to replay games from the beginning.

Prior to World War II, the only instances of suspended games in MLB were games that were successfully protested, and then resumed from the point of protest.

The first instance of a curfew-related suspended game occurred in 1943, and the first instance of a darkness-related suspended game occurred in 1952. Curfew and darkness remained the primary causes of suspended games through the 1970s. Since then, games have rarely been suspended for those reasons: the most recent suspension due to curfew occurred in 1998, and for darkness in 1987. Every instance of a game suspended due to darkness in the 1970s and 1980s occurred at Wrigley Field, which did not have field lighting until 1988.

Since 1990, weather has been the primary cause of suspended games, in situations where an official game is tied at the point that play is halted.

Two of the longest games in professional baseball history were suspended games:
 The longest professional baseball game, a minor league game started on April 18, 1981, was suspended with the score tied after the 32nd inning, at approximately 4 a.m. on April 19. The game was resumed two months later, and ended in the 33rd inning.
 On May 8, 1984, the Chicago White Sox and Milwaukee Brewers played 17 innings at Comiskey Park, then suspended the game due to a league-imposed curfew. The game was completed the next day, with Harold Baines winning the game for Chicago with a home run in the 25th inning.

By rule, all statistics for suspended games (and also games that last past midnight) are recorded under the date on which the game started.

Oddities
That events in a suspended game are considered (with regards to baseball statistics) to have occurred on the original game date, can create unusual situations. For example, it can result in a player having statistics from games that pre-date when he joined a team or first played in MLB. An example of this occurred with first baseman Vince Shupe in 1945. Shupe played in his first major league game on July 7 with the Boston Braves, and later played in the resumption of a suspended game on August 4. As the suspended game had started on June 17, Shupe has major league statistics that carry the date of that game, from weeks before he joined the Braves.

Having a game suspended can leave in question the status of a player's streak of some kind, such as a hitting streak or consecutive games played without committing an error. Additionally, the rules for substitutions in suspended games could allow a player to make an appearance for both teams in the same game, if he were traded between teams during the time that the game was suspended. This could potentially result in what would otherwise be statistically impossible situations for a pitcher, such as being credited with both a loss and a save in the same game. However, such scenarios around a traded player have not occurred in Major League Baseball to date.

Notable suspended games
A number of suspended games in major league history have been notable due to unusual circumstances or statistical oddities.

Pine Tar Incident (1983)

An unusual suspended game occurred as a result of the "pine tar incident" on July 24, 1983.  George Brett had apparently hit a home run for a 5–4 lead for his Kansas City Royals over the New York Yankees.  When the home run was initially disallowed and Brett declared out due to too much pine tar on his bat, this apparently marked the game's final out and ended play with the Yankees apparently winning 4–3.  A successful protest to American League president Lee McPhail reinstated the home run and negated the out, but as play had long since ended it became a suspended game.  The suspended game was resumed on August 18, 1983, and it was completed uneventfully, with the 5–4 Royals' lead holding up for a win.

Pirates–Cubs (1986)
On April 20, 1986, the Pittsburgh Pirates and the Chicago Cubs were tied at 8–8 after 13 innings when the umpires suspended the game, being played at Wrigley Field (which still lacked lights), on account of darkness. It was a Sunday game, and the next available slot was August 11. The game went on for four more innings before the Pirates broke through with two runs in the top of the 17th. Barry Bonds came in as a pinch-hitter in the August 11 portion of the game and stayed in the game as the center fielder. Because all statistics of the game are recorded as having occurred on April 20, some sources list that date as Bonds' MLB debut, even though Bonds' actual debut with the Pirates was May 30.

Metrodome (2004)
An unusual suspended game involving the Minnesota Twins occurred on Saturday and Sunday, October 2 and 3, 2004. The Twins' Saturday game against the Cleveland Indians was suspended due to a time limit required by the Hubert H. Humphrey Metrodome being a shared facility: there was a Minnesota Golden Gophers football game scheduled for that evening. This was not an unusual occurrence during the early part of the college football season at the Metrodome, and usually there was enough time for the baseball game to finish and the field to be prepared for the football game. However, in this case, the game went into extra innings and was suspended with the score tied. It was finished before the start of the Sunday scheduled game.

Orioles–White Sox (2008)

The game of April 28, 2008, between the Baltimore Orioles and Chicago White Sox, was suspended at the end of the 11th inning, tied 3–3, and not resumed until August 25. This created several statistical oddities. Outfielder Lou Montanez, who was called up to the majors that season on August 5, got a hit in the resumed portion of the game, thus crediting him with his first MLB career hit months before being called up. Pitcher Alberto Castillo recorded his first career victory in that game, in spite of not making his MLB debut until July 8. And Ken Griffey Jr., who walked for the White Sox in the resumed portion of the game, had gone 2-for-4 in a National League game played on April 28 while still a member of the Cincinnati Reds, thus statistically reaching base for two different teams on the same day.

2008 World Series

On October 27, 2008, in Game 5 of the 2008 World Series between the Philadelphia Phillies and the Tampa Bay Rays, continuing rain forced the Commissioner's office to suspend the game. The break in the action occurred between the top and bottom of the sixth inning, with the score tied at 2–2. This was the first suspended game in the history of the World Series. There had been three tied games previously: 1907, 1912, and 1922. Since 2009, all postseason games that are stopped due to weather are considered suspended regardless of the score or how many innings were played prior to the suspension; the first game to be affected by that rule was Game 1 of the 2011 American League Division Series between the Detroit Tigers and the New York Yankees, which started on September 30, but was suspended after two innings because of rain and was resumed the following evening.

Nationals–Astros (2009)

A unique situation occurred on July 9, 2009, when the Washington Nationals traveled to Houston to face the Astros in a game that had been suspended on May 5, in the bottom of the 11th inning, in Washington. Joel Hanrahan had pitched the top of the 11th for Washington, and in the interim had been traded to Pittsburgh for Nyjer Morgan; he remained the pitcher of record and earned the win when Morgan scored (he pinch-ran for Elijah Dukes, who was no longer on the Washington roster) on a throwing error by Miguel Tejada. It was the first walk-off victory for a team in an opposing stadium since 1975.

Indians–Royals (2014)
On August 31, 2014, the Cleveland Indians were playing the Kansas City Royals at Kauffman Stadium with the score tied, 2–2, at the end of regulation. As inclement weather began to approach, officials attempted to finish the game and were able to complete the top half of the tenth with the Indians taking a two-run advantage, 4–2. But before beginning the bottom, the game was suspended due to the weather. The resumption of the game took place on September 22 at Progressive Field because of scheduling; neither team had an off day that coincided with the other and this was their final series match-up of the season. The Royals scored one run in the inning and lost, 4–3, as the "home" team completing the game in their opponent's ballpark.

Yankees–Nationals (2018)
On June 18, 2018, the Yankees and the Nationals resumed a game suspended by rain on May 15 at Nationals Park with the score tied, 3–3. Nationals rookie Juan Soto pinch hit in the bottom of the 6th inning and hit a two-run homer. Soto's major league debut was on May 20, so officially he hit a home run five days before his debut. Technically, it was also a home run in his first official at-bat, even though he already had five home runs.

Athletics–Tigers (2019)
On September 6, 2019, the Oakland Athletics and Detroit Tigers completed a suspended game at the Oakland Coliseum. The original game took place on May 19, the finale of the Athletics' only visit to Detroit of the season. The league scheduled the resumption during the Tigers' visit to Oakland in order to avoid having the Athletics make a return trip to Detroit. Due to the long gap, both teams had to replace several players in the game who were no longer on their rosters, including Detroit's Josh Harrison, who was at bat when the original game was suspended but had since been released. Jake Diekman pitched the eighth inning for Oakland; this appearance was recorded to have occurred on May 19, when Diekman was actually a member of the Kansas City Royals and pitched in their game against the Los Angeles Angels. Diekman thus holds a rare distinction of having pitched for two teams (Royals and Athletics) on the same day.

Marlins–Mets (2021)
A game between the Miami Marlins and New York Mets started on April 11, 2021, at Citi Field in New York was suspended after just nine pitches, due to rain. Historically, such an occurrence would have resulted in the game being restarted from the beginning at a later date; however, MLB expanded the use of suspended games during the 2020 regular season and carried over the policy to the 2021 season as well. With only one out recorded in the game at the point it was suspended, it set a new major-league record for the earliest point at which a contest was suspended; the prior record had been six outs, occurring during a game at Miller Park on June 15, 2001, due to a lighting failure. The Marlins and Mets completed their suspended game on August 31, with the Mets prevailing, 6–5. The 142 days between suspension and resumption set a record for the largest gap in major-league history, the record previously having been 126 days, for a 1995 game between the Braves and Marlins.

Padres–Nationals (2021)

A game between the San Diego Padres and Washington Nationals on July 17, 2021, at Nationals Park in Washington, D.C., was suspended after gunshots were heard outside the park. The game was resumed the following day and completed without further incident.

In popular culture
The main premise of the film Mr. 3000 was caused by a game suspended due to curfew leading to the three hits the protagonist had in the game being errantly double counted.

Notes

References

External links
Historical list of suspended games at Retrosheet
Official Baseball Rules: 2019 Edition via MLB.com
 Rule 4.00—Starting and Ending a Game (from 2007 edition)

Baseball rules
Baseball terminology